Unión Deportiva Pájara Playas de Jandía was a Spanish football team based in Pájara, island of Fuerteventura, in the autonomous community of Canary Islands. Founded in 1996 and dissolved in 2011, it held home games at Estadio Benito Alonso, with a capacity of 3,000 seaters.

History
Unión Deportiva Pájara Playas de Jandía was founded in 1996, after buying Unión Deportiva La Pareds berth, a club founded 20 years earlier. It promoted to the third division at the first attempt, going on to remain there 12 consecutive years – in 2003–04 it finished second in its group, but failed in the promotion playoffs.

Pájara was dissolved on 12 July 2011, due to economic limitations.

Season to season12 seasons in Segunda División B3' seasons in Tercera División

Famous players

References

External links
Official website 
Futbolme team profile 

Association football clubs established in 1996
Association football clubs disestablished in 2011
Defunct football clubs in the Canary Islands
1996 establishments in Spain
2011 disestablishments in Spain